This is a list of the French singles and airplay chart reviews number-ones of 1955.

Number-ones by week

Singles chart

See also
1955 in music
List of number-one hits (France)

References

Number-one singles
France
1955